John Yates may refer to:

 Jack Yates (footballer, born 1860) (1860–?), English footballer with Stoke
 Jack Yates (footballer, born 1861) (1861–1917), England and Burnley footballer
 Jack Yates (John Henry Yates, 1828–1897), African American slave and later minister in Houston, Texas
 John B. Yates (1784–1836), American politician from New York
 John Melvin Yates (born 1939), American diplomat
 John P. Yates (1921–2017), American politician
 John R. Yates, American scientist specializing in proteomics
 John Yates (bishop) (1925–2008), former bishop of Gloucester
 John Yates (chemist) (1935–2015), American chemist
 John Yates (divine) (fl. 1612–1660), Anglican cleric
 John Yates (footballer, born 1929) (1929–2020), English footballer with Chester City
 John Yates (minister) (1755–1826), English Unitarian in Liverpool
 John Yates (police officer) (born 1959), former British police officer
 John Yates (rugby league), New Zealand rugby league international
 John Ashton Yates (1781–1863), member of parliament for County Carlow, Ireland

See also 
 John Butler Yeats (pronounced Yates, 1839–1922), Irish artist